Bulimeulima is a genus of medium-sized sea snails, marine gastropod mollusks in the family Eulimidae.

Species
There are only two known species to exist within this genus of gastropods, these include the following:
 Bulimeulima incolorata (Thiele, 1912)
 † Bulimeulima lentocontracta (Laws, 1941) 
 Bulimeulima magna (Bouchet & Warén, 1986)
 † Bulimeulima rhopaloides P. A. Maxwell, 1992

References

 Gofas, S.; Le Renard, J.; Bouchet, P. (2001). Mollusca. in: Costello, M.J. et al. (eds), European Register of Marine Species: a check-list of the marine species in Europe and a bibliography of guides to their identification. Patrimoines Naturels. 50: 180-213

External links
 To World Register of Marine Species
 Bouchet, P. & Warén, A. (1986). Revision of the Northeast Atlantic bathyal and abyssal Aclididae Eulimidae, Epitonidae (Mollusca, Gastropoda). Bollettino Malacologico. suppl. 2: 297-576.

Eulimidae